The Suzuki Kizashi is a mid-size car manufactured by Japanese automaker Suzuki. It was unveiled in the United States on July 30, 2009. The Kizashi went on sale in Japan on October 21, 2009, in North America on December 1, 2009, and in Australia and New Zealand on May 11, 2010. It is the first mid-size Suzuki automobile sold in the Australian market. In February 2011, the Kizashi became available to the Indian market. The car was also available on European markets. In 2012, the Kizashi was also sold in the Iranian market.

In December 2013, Suzuki announced that the Kizashi would be gradually discontinued on global markets, and would not get a successor. In December 2014, the production of the car ceased in the Sagara plant. Despite a good technical record, the car had suffered from poor sales because of the global financial crisis and Suzuki's withdrawal from the American and Canadian markets in 2013 and 2014, respectively.

Etymology
Kizashi (In kanji: 兆) is a Japanese word which means "something great is coming", "omen", "sign", or "warning".

Description and models

Suzuki Kizashi is a family sedan sized between compact and mid-size models. It is available in base, SE, Sport GTS and Sport SLS trims.

Available transmissions are a 6-speed manual or a continuously variable transmission (CVT). The Kizashi offers 17 and 18-inch alloy wheels, Akebono sourced brakes, a choice of cloth or leather seating surfaces, and a 425-watt Rockford Fosgate audio system with iPod connectivity and Bluetooth capability (some models do not provide Bluetooth capability). All-wheel drive (AWD) (based on the i-AWD system featured in the SX4) is optional and includes a driver-activated FWD mode to save fuel.

Safety
The Kizashi comes standard with antilock brakes, traction and stability control, front and rear side airbags and full-length side curtain airbags. An enhanced stability control system is included with the available all-wheel drive.

The Kizashi has a 5-star safety rating from ANCAP.

Awards
In 2010 and 2011, Kizashi won two AutoPacific's annual Vehicle Satisfaction Awards for overall satisfaction among all new midsize cars sold or leased in the United States.

In 2011, Suzuki Kizashi named Best Buy by Consumers Digest.

In December 2010, the Kizashi won two motoring awards in New Zealand: the Supreme Winner in the 2010 AA Motoring Excellence Awards and the New Zealand Herald Car of the Year Award. The car was praised for its astonishing attention to detail, refinement and comfort.

India
Maruti Suzuki, 54.2% owned by Suzuki Motor Corporation, launched the Maruti Kizashi on February 2, 2011. It is imported as a Completely Built Unit (CBU), which attracts import duties of 105%. It was priced at around 16 to 17.5 lakh rupees. It has since been withdrawn from the Indian market due to poor sales.

This model has a J24B 2.4 litre petrol engine with 4 cylinders, 16 valves DOHC. It produces  of torque at 4,000 rpm. The Maruti Kizashi utilizes a direct ignition system for increased fuel efficiency with decreased emissions. With the help of this and other engine technologies, the car gives 9 km/L in the city and 12 km/L on the highway. The fuel tank capacity of the car is 63 L. Maruti Suzuki though, has not been able to sell many units since the Kizashi is petrol only (running a petrol car in India is expensive compared to a diesel), and the fact that it is expensive there.

Pakistan
The Kizashi currently is on sale only in Pakistan as it has been removed from other markets. Pak Suzuki Motors, a subsidiary of Suzuki Motor Corporation in Pakistan, launched the Suzuki Kizashi on February 11, 2015 at Pearl Continental Hotel, Lahore. It is imported as a Completely Built-up Unit (CBU) with no plans to manufacture it locally. The ex-factory price at launch was PKR 5.0 million.

Problems
On June 28, 2010, Suzuki recalled 5,107 model year 2010 Kizashi vehicles due to a glove box door that failed to comply with FMVSS 201 ("Occupant Protection in Interior Impact") in which the door could open in a crash.

On July 30, 2014, Suzuki recalled an undisclosed number of select model year 2010–2013 Kizashi vehicles manufactured October 2009 through July 2012 as spiders could weave webs into the evaporative canister causing it to become blocked and creating excessive negative pressure within the fuel tank. Negative pressure could cause the fuel tank to crack, resulting in a higher risk of fire.

Sales 

Sales in Japan
In Japan, Suzuki sold 3,379 units between 2009–2015. Of the 3,379 vehicles sold, one quarter was acquired by the National Police Agency (Japan).

Concept versions

2007–2008
Concept Kizashi 1
The first Kizashi concept included a 2.0L 16-valve turbo diesel engine, sequential 6-speed transmission, 21-inch aluminium alloy wheels, and AWD. It was unveiled at the 2007 Frankfurt Motor Show.

Concept Kizashi 2
The second Kizashi concept was a 5-door crossover sport wagon that included a 3.6 L (3,564 cc) V6 engine, 6-speed automatic transmission, i-AWD, and 265/45ZR22 tires. It was unveiled at the 2007 Tokyo Motor Show.

Concept Kizashi 3
The Concept Kizashi 3 was unveiled at the 2008 New York International Auto Show.

2011 New York International Auto Show
Kizashi Apex

Kizashi EcoCharge

The new hybrid drivetrain is further aided in its quest for improved fuel efficiency by a six-speed automatic transmission, low rolling resistance tires, regenerative braking, and stop-start technology, which add up to a significant mpg improvement compared to the current, “conventional” Suzuki. Steve Younan, director of automotive marketing and product planning for American Suzuki Motor Corporation, says that the company is making plans to move forward with a similar product, and that “the proof of (Suzuki’s) concept is that the Kizashi EcoCharge has the capability to deliver a 25 % fuel economy gain in real-world driving through an electric charge to the powertrain system while still retaining the production Kizashi’s dynamic handling and braking advantages that make it a standout category performer.”

References

External links

Kizashi
Cars introduced in 2009
2010s cars
Mid-size cars
Sedans
Front-wheel-drive vehicles
All-wheel-drive vehicles
Vehicles with CVT transmission